Gerard III of Guelders (1185 – 22 October 1229) was the Count of Guelders and Zutphen from 1207 until his death in 1229. He was a son of Count Otto I of Guelders, and is sometimes called Gerard IV or Gerard V. Gerard married Margaretha of Brabant, the daughter of Duke Hendrik I of Brabant and Matilda of Flanders, Duchess of Brabant, in 1206.

Life
Gerard was an influential knight in the court of the emperor Frederick II, but fell out of grace and the emperor destroyed Roermond in 1213 after a conflict between them. He fought the Bishop of Utrecht Otto II of Lippe over Salland but supported the Bishop in the Battle of Ane. He was captured in this battle in 1227. The chronicle of Johannes de Beke mentions that Gerard was killed in battle. Another source mentions that Gerard was killed in a battle at Zutphen in 1229.

Family
Gerard was a son of Count Otto I of Guelders and Richardis of Bavaria. He married Margaret of Brabant, the daughter of Henry I, Duke of Brabant, and Matilda of Flanders. They had:
 Otto II, Count of Guelders, married first Margaret of Cleves, daughter of Dietrich IV, Count of Cleves and his first wife, Mathilde von Dinslaken. The married second Philippe of Dammartin, daughter of Simon of Dammartin, Count of Aumâle and his wife Marie, Countess of Ponthieu.
 , Bishop of Liège
 Margaret of Guelders
 Richardis of Guelders, married William IV, Count of Jülich.

References

Sources

House of Wassenberg
Counts of Zutphen
Gerard 03
1185 births
1229 deaths
12th-century people of the Holy Roman Empire
13th-century people of the Holy Roman Empire